God's New Covenant: A New Testament Translation is a modern English translation by Heinz Cassirer of the Greek New Testament, published in 1989. 

Cassirer completed his translation of the New Testament in just thirteen months.

Below is a sample passage, Matthew 7:24-25.

References 

New Testament editions
Bible translations into English